Bajamar is a coastal town in the northeast of the island of Tenerife in the Canary Islands, Spain, belonging to the municipality of San Cristóbal de La Laguna. Administratively it is included in Zone 5 of the municipality. Formerly it was considered a neighborhood of Tejina, another town in San Cristóbal de La Laguna. It is a small tourist and holiday center.

Features 
Bajamar is located at the foot of the westernmost foothills of the Anaga Massif, fourteen kilometers from the town of La Laguna. It has an average altitude of 48 meters above sea level, reaching its maximum 601 meters above sea level at Pico Isogue.

Bajamar occupies an area of 2.08 km² that includes the urban nucleus and a small rural and natural area, partially included in the protected space of the Anaga rural park. It borders Punta del Hidalgo, in the area of El Paso del Guanche, with Tegueste in the summits, and with Tejina in the area of El Riego.

It has the Bajamar Citizen Center, the El Tamboril Children's Center, the hermitage of San Juan, and a Red Cross post. It also owns the CBV Costa Lagunera Basketball School and the Bajamar Yacht Club.

In recent years it has gone from being a tourist center with numerous hotels to a local tourist area and a residential area with several apartments and no hotels.

The town has several natural pools and the beach of Bajamar or San Juan, as well as the natural pool of Mariane and Charco Redondo and the surfing zone of Baja Nueva, El Paso, el Lobo and las Bordas.

Demographics

Festivals 
Bajamar celebrates Gran Poder de Dios from August 7 to August 25. During August, the Bajamar International Folkloric Festival is celebrated, organized by the Isogue Folkloric Group. On August 18, 2000, coinciding with the VI edition, the Bajamar Folk Festival acquired international status.

The Bajamar 3X3 basketball championship is also held, the oldest in the Canary Islands (since 1993), organized by the CBV Costa Lagunera. For some years now, the Las Viejas Glorias del Paso Festival, celebrating surfing, has been celebrated on the last Sunday of August.

Communications 
The town is reached through the Bajamar-Punta del Hidalgo TF-13 Highway.

Public transportation 
By bus, called guagua, it is connected by the following TITSA lines:

Paths 
To Bajamar they lead a path suitable for hiking, which is approved in the Network of Senderos de Tenerife: 7

 Trail PR TF-12 Cruz del Carmen - Bajamar

Places of interest 

 Bajamar Natural Pool
 San Juan or Bajamar Beach
 Arenal Beach
 The Wolf Beach
 Charco de Laja or Charco de los Pobres
 Puddle of El Mariane

References

Tenerife
Canary Islands